Senator Steinberg may refer to:

Darrell Steinberg (born 1959), California State Senate
Melvin Steinberg (born 1933), Maryland State Senate
Bob Steinburg (born 1948), North Carolina State Senate